Takuma Edamura (枝村 匠馬 Edamura Takuma, born 16 November 1986 in Makinohara, Shizuoka, Japan) is a Japanese footballer.

Career
Edamura was born in Shizuoka Prefecture. Having worked his way through the youth ranks of his local Shimizu S-Pulse club team, he signed full-time terms in 2005. Since 2006, he has been a regular member of the first team.

He joined Cerezo Osaka during the summer transfer market in 2012.

Club career stats
Updated to 23 February 2018.

References

External links
Profile at Shimizu S-Pulse 

1986 births
Living people
Association football people from Shizuoka Prefecture
Japanese footballers
J1 League players
J2 League players
J3 League players
Shimizu S-Pulse players
Cerezo Osaka players
Nagoya Grampus players
Vissel Kobe players
Avispa Fukuoka players
Tochigi SC players
Fujieda MYFC players
Association football midfielders